Jorge Omar del Río is a former Argentine racing driver. He won the TC2000 championship three times in succession between 1980 and 1982, and currently runs a racing school in Benavídez, Tigre Partido, Buenos Aires.

References

Argentine racing drivers
TC 2000 Championship drivers
Turismo Carretera drivers
Living people
World Sportscar Championship drivers
Year of birth missing (living people)